Vladyslav or Volodyslav is a Ukrainian given name for males. The female variant is the same with the addition of 'a' at the end.

The name is of old Slavic origin and is mainly used in Poland. The name derives from the Ukrainian words (Володіти (volodity) - to possess, + слава (slava) - glory, or слово (slovo) - word) meaning one who is a "possessor of glory, fame". 

Many of Poland's kings bore this name. Its variant in Russian is Vladislav; Belarusian - Ŭladzislaŭ (Ўладзіслаў); Czech - Ladislav.

In Ukraine and Russia this name became popular in the 1960s and 1970s as Polish culture became popular, as a way to be connected to Western culture that was permitted by the Soviet regime for the Soviet people.
Given names
Ukrainian masculine given names